Damash (also Romanized as Dāmāsh and Dāmash; also known as Dāmāshak) is a village in Jirandeh Rural District, Amarlu District, Rudbar County, Gilan Province, Iran. At the 2006 census, its population was 251, in 89 families.

Lilium ledebourii is its natural plant.

Etymology 

Damasch has a same root with Domestic in English and means house, " from domus "house," :la:Domus from PIE *domo-/*domu- "house, household" (cf. Skt. damah "house;" Avestan demana- "house;" Gk. domos "house," despotes "master, lord;" L. dominus "master of a household;" O.C.S. domu, Rus. dom "house;" Lith. dimstis "enclosed court, property;" O.E. timber "building, structure"), from *dem-/*dom- "build." The usual IE word for "house" (It., Sp. casa are from L. casa "cottage, hut;" Gmc. *hus is of obscure origin). The noun is 1539; domesticate is from 1639. Domestics, originally "articles of home manufacture," is attested from 1622.

References 

 Book of Amarlu - M.M. Zand

Populated places in Rudbar County